FC Vostok (Vostok Fýtbol Klýby) was a Kazakh football club from Oskemen (Ust-Kamenogorsk), and a founding member of the Kazakhstan Premier League in 1992. The club's best finish in the league was 5th place in 1997 and again in 1998.

History
On 19 September 2008, FC Shakhter and FC Vostok were found guilty of one count of match fixing. Coaches and management involved were banned from football for 60 months and both clubs were expelled from the Kazakhstan Premier League On 2 October 2008, the Football Federation of Kazakhstan revised these decisions. FC Vostok's expulsion was upheld, while FC Shakhter's punishment was reduced to a deduction of nine points. The result of the fixed match was annulled, and all remaining Vostok games were to be counted as won 3–0 by their opponents. However, the expulsion of FC Vostok from the Kazakhstan Cup 2008 was revoked.

A new club, FC Altai Semey, was founded in January 2016 from the merger of FC Vostok and Spartak Semey.

Names
1963 : Founded as Vostok
1997 : Renamed Vostok Adil
1998 : Renamed Vostok
1999 : Renamed Vostok Altyn
2003 : Renamed Vostok

Domestic history

Continental history

Honours
Kazakhstan First Division
Champions (1): 2010
Kazakhstan Cup
Winners (1): 1994

Current squad

Previous managers
  Sergey Kvochkin (1973–75), (1976–78), (1984–86)
  Vakhid Masudov (2002)
  Aleksandr Piskaryov (2004)
  Andrei Miroshnichenko (2009)
  Pavel Saliy (2012)
  Vladimir Fomichyov (Jan 2013)
  Pavel Yevteyev (2014–2015)

References

External links
 Official website
 Fan website

Defunct football clubs in Kazakhstan
Association football clubs established in 1963
1963 establishments in the Kazakh Soviet Socialist Republic